The Muslim conquest of Pars took place from 638/9 to 650/1, and ended with subjugation of the important Sasanian province of Pars to the Rashidun Caliphate.

History

First Muslim invasion and the successful Sasanian counter-attack
The Muslim invasion of Pars first began in 638/9, when the Rashidun governor of Bahrain, al-'Ala' ibn al-Hadrami, who after having defeated some rebellious Arab tribes, seized an island in the Persian Gulf. Although al-'Ala' and the rest of the Arabs had been ordered to not invade Pars or its surrounding islands, he and his men continued their raids into the province. Al-'Ala quickly prepared an army which was divided into three groups, one under al-Jarud ibn Mu'alla, the second under al-Sawwar ibn Hammam and the third under Khulayd ibn al-Mundhir ibn Sawa. When the first group entered Pars, it was quickly defeated and al-Jarud was killed.

The same thing soon happened to the second group. However, things proved to be more fortunate with the third group; Khulayd managed to keep them on bay, but was unable to withdraw back to Bahrain due to the Sasanians blocking his way at the sea. Umar, finding out about al-'Ala's invasion of Pars, had him replaced with Sa'd ibn Abi Waqqas as the governor of Bahrain. Umar then ordered Utbah ibn Ghazwan to send reinforcements to Khulayd. When the reinforcements arrived, Khulayd and some of his men managed successfully to withdraw back to Bahrain, while the rest withdrew to Basra.

Second and last Muslim invasion
In ca. 643, Uthman ibn Abi al-As seized Bishapur, and made a peace treaty with the inhabitants of the city.
In 19/644, al-'Ala' once again attacked Pars from Bahrain, reaching as far as Estakhr, until he was repelled by the governor (marzban) of Pars, Shahrag. Some time later, Uthman ibn Abi al-As managed to establish a military base at Tawwaj, and shortly defeated and killed Shahrag near Rew-shahr (however other sources states that it was his brother who did it). A Persian convert to Islam, Hormoz ibn Hayyan al-'Abdi, was shortly sent by Uthman ibn Abi al-'As to attack a fortress known as Senez on the coast of Pars. After the accession of Uthman ibn Affan as the new Caliph of the Rashidun Caliphate on 11 November, the inhabitants of Bishapur under the leadership of Shahrag's brother declared independence, but were defeated. However the date for this revolt mains disputed, as the Persian historian al-Baladhuri states that it occurred in 646.

In 648, 'Abd-Allah ibn al-'Ash'ari forced the governor of Estakhr, Mahak, to surrender the city. However, this was not the final conquest of Estakhr, as the inhabitants of the city would later rebel in 649/50 while its newly appointed governor, 'Abd-Allah ibn 'Amir was trying to capture Gor. The military governor of the province, 'Ubayd Allah ibn Ma'mar, was defeated and killed. In 650/1, the Sasanian emperor Yazdegerd III went to Estakhr and tried to plan an organized resistance against the Arabs, and after some time he went to Gor, but Estakhr failed to put up a strong resistance, and was soon sacked by the Arabs, who killed over 40,000 defenders. The Arabs then quickly seized Gor, Kazerun and Siraf, while Yazdegerd III fled to Kirman. Thus ended the Muslim conquest of Pars, however, the inhabitants of the province would later several times rebel against the Arabs.

References

Sources
 
 
 
 
 

650s conflicts
640s conflicts
630s conflicts
History of Fars Province
Pars